Schistura striata is a species of stone loach endemic to India where it occurs in Kerala and Karnataka.  This fish grows to a length of  SL.

References

Schistura
Fish of India
Fish described in 1867